Garlic (Allium sativum) is a species in the onion genus commonly used as a food flavoring.

Garlic may also refer to:

Places in the United States
 Garlic Island, Wisconsin
 Garlic Creek, near Buda, Texas

Other uses
 Operation Garlic, a Royal Air Force Second World War attack
 Garlic Jr., a character from Dragon Ball

See also
 Allium tuberosum, a Chinese plant known as garlic chives
 Peltaria alliacea, a perennial in the family Brassicaceae, known as garlic cress
 Pelobates fuscus, a species of toad nicknamed the garlic toad
 Garlick, a surname